The 2011 Blackpool Borough Council election took place on 5 May 2011 to elect members of the unitary Blackpool Borough Council in England. The whole council was up for election and the Labour party gained overall control of the council from the Conservative party.

Election result
The results saw Blackpool Labour gain 15 seats to take control from the Conservatives. Conservative councillors who lost seats included the deputy leader of the party Ian Fowler and the cabinet member for education, Peter Collins. Meanwhile, the Liberal Democrats were reduced to just one councillor, Douglas Green. Overall turnout at the election was 37.41%.

The Conservative leader of the council Peter Callow said the Labour result was "well-earned" and that cuts made by the national government were to blame for the Conservative losses.  Meanwhile, the Labour leader Simon Blackburn called the result "very pleasing, but not unexpected".

Ward results

Anchorsholme

Bispham

Bloomfield

Brunswick

Claremont

Clifton

Greenlands

Hawes Side

Highfield

Ingthorpe

Layton

Marton

Norbreck

Park

Squires Gate

Stanley

Talbot

Tyldesley

Victoria

Warbreck

Waterloo

References

2011 English local elections
2011
2010s in Lancashire